Lindon Oscar Crow (April 4, 1933 – October 25, 2018) was an American football cornerback who played professionally in the National Football League (NFL). He was named to three Pro Bowls.

College career
Crow played college football at the University of Southern California.  Playing both defensive back and running back, Crow rushed for 723 yards, caught 13 passes for 412 yards, scored 11 touchdowns, and intercepted 11 passes on defense.  Crow helped lead the Trojans to two Rose Bowls, including a win over Wisconsin in 1953

Professional career
Crow played in the National Football League for the Chicago Cardinals, the New York Giants, and the Los Angeles Rams.  He led the league with 11 interceptions in 1956.  He also recorded an interception in the 1958 NFL Championship Game.  In the following season, Crow  He finished his career with 38 interceptions, which he returned for 512 yards and two touchdowns.  He also recovered 9 fumbles, returning them for 65 yards and a score.  On special teams, he returned 25 punts for 134 yards.

References

1933 births
2018 deaths
People from Denison, Texas
Players of American football from Texas
American football cornerbacks
USC Trojans football players
Chicago Cardinals players
New York Giants players
Los Angeles Rams players
Eastern Conference Pro Bowl players